Tsolmonbaataryn Anudari (born 9 July 1997) is a Mongolian sports shooter. She competed in the women's 10 metre air pistol event at the 2020 Summer Olympics.

References

External links
 

1997 births
Living people
Mongolian female sport shooters
Olympic shooters of Mongolia
Shooters at the 2020 Summer Olympics
Place of birth missing (living people)
21st-century Mongolian women